Donald MacLean (born January 14, 1977) is a Canadian ice hockey coach and former professional player. He is currently an assistant coach for the Sault Ste. Marie Greyhounds of the Ontario Hockey League (OHL). MacLean played in the National Hockey League (NHL) with the Los Angeles Kings, Toronto Maple Leafs, Columbus Blue Jackets, Detroit Red Wings and the Phoenix Coyotes.

Playing career
As a youth, MacLean played in the 1990 and 1991 Quebec International Pee-Wee Hockey Tournaments with a minor ice hockey team from Bedford, Nova Scotia.

MacLean was selected 33rd overall in the 1995 NHL Entry Draft by the Los Angeles Kings. MacLean spent three years playing junior hockey in the Quebec Major Junior Hockey League.  In his second year he tallied 89 points in 61 games playing for three different teams (Beauport Harfangs, Laval Titan Collège Français and Hull Olympiques).  His NHL debut was in Los Angeles in the 1997–1998 season where he played 22 games notching five goals and two assists.

On February 23, 2000, MacLean was traded by the Kings to the Toronto Maple Leafs for Craig Charron. MacLean spent the majority of his contract with the Leafs in the minors with the St. John's Maple Leafs of the American Hockey League. After finishing the 2001–02 as the AHL leading scorer, MacLean made his NHL play-off debut with the Leafs, playing in 3 games. On July 17, 2002, MacLean signed as a free agent with the Columbus Blue Jackets and appeared in four regular season games.

On August 24, 2005, MacLean was signed by the Detroit Red Wings. In his first game as a Red Wing, MacLean opened the scoring against the Edmonton Oilers on an assist from Niklas Kronwall with a man-advantage.  The Red Wings would eventually shut out the Oilers and MacLean was credited with the game-winning goal.

In the AHL, playing for the Red Wings affiliate Grand Rapids Griffins, MacLean recorded a point in 19 straight games between January 6 and February 18, 2006.  This was the longest point streak for any AHL player in the 2005–06 season.  The same year, MacLean scored five hat-tricks, the most by an AHL player since 2000.  He participated in the 2006 Rbk Hockey AHL All-Star Classic with fellow Griffins Jiri Hudler and Valtteri Filppula, scoring two goals for the Canadian team.  He also won the Hardest Shot event in the Skills Competition. MacLean finished the season as the league MVP and leading goal-scorer.

MacLean signed as a free agent to a two-year contract with the Phoenix Coyotes on July 17, 2006, where he would primarily play for the San Antonio Rampage of the AHL.

Maclean left the final year of his contract with the Coyotes and signed with Swiss team ZSC Lions on July 16, 2007, he however left for Austria on December 9, 2007, signing with EC Salzburg. Maclean then went on to help Salzburg win the EBEL league. Following a short stint in the Oddset Ligaen with the Rødovre Mighty Bulls MacLean then transferred midway through the 2008–09 season to the Swedish HockeyAllsvenskan with the Malmö Redhawks. MacLean veteran experience helped him lead the Redhawks with 30 points in 38 games. After signing a contract extension with Malmö for the 2009-10 season, MacLean scored a further 16 goals in 42 games.

On August 18, 2010, MacLean agreed to a trial to the return to the EBEL with Croatian team, KHL Medveščak. After impressing in two weeks of training, MacLean was officially signed on a one-year contract on September 1, 2010.

Coaching career
On June 29, 2015, MacLean was named assistant coach for the Sault Ste. Marie Greyhounds of the Ontario Hockey League.

Career statistics

Awards and honours

References

External links

1977 births
Beauport Harfangs players
Canadian ice hockey centres
Columbus Blue Jackets players
Detroit Red Wings players
EC Red Bull Salzburg players
Espoo Blues players
Fredericton Canadiens players
Grand Rapids Griffins (IHL) players
Grand Rapids Griffins players
Hull Olympiques players
Ice hockey people from Nova Scotia
KHL Medveščak Zagreb players
Laval Titan Collège Français players
Living people
Los Angeles Kings draft picks
Los Angeles Kings players
Lowell Lock Monsters players
Malmö Redhawks players
People from Sydney, Nova Scotia
Phoenix Coyotes players
Rødovre Mighty Bulls players
St. John's Maple Leafs players
San Antonio Rampage players
Sault Ste. Marie Greyhounds coaches
Sportspeople from the Cape Breton Regional Municipality
Springfield Falcons players
Syracuse Crunch players
Toronto Maple Leafs players
Canadian expatriate ice hockey players in Austria
Canadian expatriate ice hockey players in Croatia
Canadian expatriate ice hockey players in Denmark
Canadian expatriate ice hockey players in Finland
Canadian expatriate ice hockey players in Sweden
Canadian ice hockey coaches